Paohanli Peak or Paunhuri (simplified Chinese: 泡罕里峰; traditional Chinese: 泡罕里峰 ; Standard Tibetan: ???, is a  peak at the border of Zarkang, Yadong County, Tibet (China) and Sikkim (India). From the north to the south, near Paohanli Peak there are four peaks with an altitude of over : Molayi, Tovhenyolu, Qijolabje and Kanchangbinshong.

See also
List of Ultras of the Himalayas
Pauhunri

References

External links
 https://www.flickr.com/photos/soumava/Pauhunri

China–India border
Mountains of Tibet
Mountains of Sikkim
International mountains of Asia